Cabo Delgado is the northernmost province of Mozambique. As well as bordering Mtwara Region in the neighboring country of Tanzania, it borders the provinces of Nampula and Niassa. The region is an ethnic stronghold of the Makonde tribe, with the Makua and Mwani as leading ethnic minorities.

Pemba is the capital of the province; other important cities include Montepuez and Mocímboa da Praia.

History

The province shares its name with Cape Delgado, a coastal headland on the border between Mozambique and Tanzania, which forms the northernmost point in Mozambique.

On 25 September 1964, FRELIMO guerrillas arrived from Tanzania and, with help from some individuals of the surrounding population, attacked a Portuguese administrative post in the province. This raid marked the beginning of the Mozambican War of Independence, part of the Portuguese Colonial War, the former of which was an armed struggle between the Portuguese colonial authorities in the then-Portuguese Overseas Province of Mozambique and the independence movement. This province was the focus of Operation Gordian Knot, where the Portuguese forces attempted to wipe out the guerrilla bases in the province.

Jihadist insurgency

Beginning in October 2017, armed Islamist extremists linked to the Islamic State of Iraq and the Levant (ISIL) launched a jihadist insurgency in the Cabo Delgado region. The militants launched attacks and committed mass beheadings, and in August 2020 seized the port town of Mocimboa da Praia. The group sometimes refers to itself as al-Shabaab, although they do not have known links with the Somali al-Shabaab, a different jihadist group. In March 2021, the U.S. Department of State designated Ahlu Sunna Wal Jammah (ASWJ), a group operating in Cabo Delgado with the participation of "foreign fighters" from Tanzania, as a franchise of ISIL and added it to its list of Foreign Terrorist Organizations. The International Crisis Group reported in March 2021 that while ISIL has contact with the jihadists in Mozambique and has given some level of financial assistance, ISIL likely does not exert command and control authority over the group.

Mozambique Defence Armed Forces have been battling the extremists. Many civilians have been displaced by the fighting. In September 2020, ISIL insurgents captured Vamizi Island in the Indian Ocean. Over fifty people were beheaded by terrorists in the province in April 2020 and a similar number in November 2020. In March 2021, the NGO Save the Children reported that Islamist militants were beheading children, some as young as 11.

On March 24, 2021, the militants seized Palma, murdering dozens of civilians and displacing more than 35,000 of the town's 75,000 residents. Many fled to the provincial capital, Pemba. In July 2021 Southern African Development Community deployed its military mission to the province Southern African Development Community Mission in Mozambique (SAMIM).

As of February 2022, there are still a few civilians being killed due to the lingering insurgency and several insurgent camps were found by the Mozambican authorities.

Demographics

Religion
Mozambique is a majority-Christian country; however two northern provinces have an Islamic majority – Niassa (61 percent) and Cabo Delgado (54 percent). In Cabo Delgado, only three districts have a Catholic majority – Muidumbe (67 percent) and Mueda (54 percent) in the north and Namuno (61 percent) in the south. Two other districts have significant Catholic populations – Nangade (42 percent Catholic, 36 percent Muslim) in the north and Chiure (44 percent Muslim, 42 percent Catholic) in the South, whilst twelve have Muslim majorities, including Pemba; four are more than 90 percent Muslim. Coastal administrative posts are all over 75 percent Muslim.

Districts

Cabo Delgado Province is divided into the 16 districts of:
 Ancuabe District – covering 4,606 km² with 109,792 inhabitants,
 Balama District – covering 5,619 km² with 126,116 inhabitants,
 Chiúre District – covering 4,210 km² with 230,044 inhabitants,
 Ibo District – covering just 48 km² with 9,509 inhabitants,
 Macomia District – covering 4,049 km² with 81,208 inhabitants,
 Mecúfi District – covering 1,192 km² with 43,573 inhabitants,
 Meluco District – covering 5,799 km² with 25,184 inhabitants,
 Mocímboa da Praia District – covering 3,548 km² with 94,197 inhabitants,
 Montepuez District – covering 15,871 km² with 185,635 inhabitants,
 Mueda District – covering 14,150 km² with 120,067 inhabitants,
 Muidumbe District – covering 1,987 km² with 73,457 inhabitants,
 Namuno District – covering 6,915 km² with 179,992 inhabitants,
 Nangade District – covering 3,031 km² with 63,739 inhabitants,
 Palma District – covering 3,493 km² with 48,423 inhabitants,
 Pemba-Metuge District – covering 1,094 km² with 65,365 inhabitants (excluding the city of Pemba),
 Quissanga District – covering 2,061 km² with 35,192 inhabitants;
and the municipalities of:
 Mocimboa da Praia
 Montepuez
 Pemba – covering 194 km² with 141,316 inhabitants.

Economy

Mining
Balama mine

References

External links
  Cabo Delgado Province official site

 
Provinces of Mozambique